World Telecommunication and Information Society Day is an international day proclaimed in November 2006 by the International Telecommunication Union Plenipotentiary Conference in Antalya, Turkey, to be celebrated annually on 17 May.

History 
World Telecommunication Day
The day had previously been known as 'World Telecommunication Day' to commemorate the founding of the International Telecommunication Union on 17 May 1865. It was instituted by the Plenipotentiary Conference in Malaga-Torremolinos in 1973.

The main objective of the day was to raise global awareness of social changes brought about by the Internet and new technologies. It also aims to help reduce the digital divide.

World Information Society Day
World Information Society Day was an international day proclaimed to be on 17 May by a United Nations General Assembly resolution, following the 2005 World Summit on the Information Society in Tunis.

World Telecommunication and Information Society Day
In November 2006, the ITU Plenipotentiary Conference in Antalya, Turkey, decided to celebrate both events on 17 May as World Telecommunication and Information Society Day.

All previous topics 

 1969 The role and activities of the Union
 1970 Telecommunications and training
 1971 Space and Telecommunications
 1972 World Telecommunication Network
 1973 International Cooperation
1974 Telecommunications and Transportation
1975 Telecommunications and Meteorology
1976 Telecommunications and Information
1977 Telecommunications and Development
1978 Radio Communications
1979 Telecommunications in the Service of Mankind
1980 Rural Telecom
1981 Telecommunications and Health
1982 International Cooperation
1983 One world, One network
1984 Telecommunications: a Broad Vision
1985 Telecom is Good For Development
1986 Partner On The Move
1987 Telecom Serves All Countries
1988 Dissemination of Technological Knowledge in The Electronic Age
1989 International Cooperation
1990 Telecommunications and Industrial Development
1991 Telecommunications and Human Security
1992 Telecommunications and Space: Xintiandi
1993 Telecommunications and Human Development
1994 Telecommunications and Culture
1995 Telecommunications and Environment
1996 Telecommunications and Sports
1997 Telecommunications and Humanitarian Aid
1998 Telecom Trade
1999 E-commerce
2000 Mobile Communications
2001 Internet: Challenges, Opportunities and Prospects
2002 Helping People Bridge the Digital Divide
2003 Helping all Mankind Communicate
2004 Information and Communication Technology: A Path to Sustainable Development
2005 Take Action to Create a Fair Information Society
2006 Advancing Global Cyber Security
2007 Let ICT Benefit The Next Generation
2008 Let ICT Benefit People With Disabilities, and Let All People Enjoy ICT Opportunities
2009 Protect Children's Online Safety
2010 ICT Makes Urban Life Better
2011 ICT Makes Rural Life Better
2012 Information Communication and Women
2013 ICT and Improving Road Safety
2014 Broadband Promotes sustainable Development
2015 Telecommunications and Information and Communication Technology: Driving Forces of Innovation
2016 Promote ICT Entrepreneurship and Expand Social Impact
2017 Develop Big Data and Expand Influence
2018 Promote the Proper Use of Artificial Intelligence For the Benefit of All Mankind
2019 Narrowing the Standardization Gap
2020 Connectivity Goal 2030: Using ICT to Promote the Achievement of the Sustainable Development Goals
2021 Accelerating Digital Transformation in challenging time 
2022 Digital technologies for older persons and health againg

See also 
System Administrator Appreciation Day
Programmers' Day
World Development Information Day
World Television Day

References

External links 
 World Telecommunication and Information Society Day — United Nations
World Telecommunication and Information Society Day — International Telecommunication Union

United Nations General Assembly resolutions
Non-profit technology
Internet governance
International Telecommunication Union
May observances
United Nations days